The Shantala Natya Sri Award is an award given every year by the Government of Karnataka to dancers in recognition of their contributions in the filed of classical dance. Santala, the queen of Vishnuvardhana, the Hoysala king, was a dancer who made great contributions to classical dance and architecture. The award is named after her.

The award consists of a plaque, shawl, garland and cash reward of 5 lakhs (0.5 Million) Indian rupee. It was in 2009, the amount was increased to 5 lakhs.

Since its inception in 1995, the award has been given to a total of 24 individuals. K. Venkatalakshamma was the first dancer to receive the award and the most recent recipient is B. Bhanumati, who was awarded in the year 2018.

Awardees

References

Awards established in 1995
Dance awards
1995 establishments in Karnataka
Civil awards and decorations of Karnataka